Trebitsch is a surname. Notable people with the surname include:

Abraham Trebitsch (c. 1760–?), Austrian scholar
Arthur Trebitsch (1880–1927) Austrian writer and racial theorist
Gyula Trebitsch (1914–2005), German film producer
Ignaz Trebitsch-Lincoln (1879–1943), Hungarian adventurer
Nahum Trebitsch (1779–1842), Czech-Austrian rabbi
Siegfried Trebitsch (1868–1956), Austrian playwright, translator, novelist and poet
Willy Trenk-Trebitsch (1902–1983), Austrian actor

See also
Třebíč
Trzebicz (disambiguation)